Soham is a town and civil parish in the district of East Cambridgeshire, in Cambridgeshire, England, just off the A142 between Ely and Newmarket. Its population was 10,860 at the 2011 census.

History

Archaeology
The region between Devil's Dyke and the line between Littleport and Shippea Hill shows a remarkable amount of archaeological findings of the Stone Age, the Bronze Age and the Iron Age. A couple of hoards of bronze objects are found in the area of Soham, including one with swords and spearheads of the later Bronze Age as well as a gold torc, retrieved in 1938.

A large Anglo-Saxon settlement was discovered on land between Brook Street and Fordham Road, next to Roman remains in the old Fisky's Hill area and former allotment site in 2013 and onwards. During the establishment of the Fordham Road cemetery, in the late 1800's, burial remains were also found with several high-status grave goods, including a girdle hanger, beads and jewellery. These items are now housed in the British Museum. Further Bronze and Iron Age settlements and related activity has also been noted in the north of the town during recent development on the sites. Many Neolithic items have been found whilst field walking to the East of the town along with fossils towards the bypass.

An extensive ditch system, not visible via aerial photography, has also been identified, as well as a wooden trackway  in length between Fordey Farm (Barway) and Little Thetford, with associated shards of later Bronze Age pottery (1935).

Name and early geography 
According to an article published in Fenland Notes & Queries in 1899:

Soham Mere finds mention in Liber Eliensis relating King Cnut's winter visit to the monks of Ely for the Feast of the Purification. This tale was elaborated as an 'Old English Novelet' in 1844, describing how King Cnut's nobles were concerned for his safety in crossing the Soham Mere ice. If the ice broke this would drown the king in the Fen waters. Cnut insisted on travelling (in a sledge) should there be a fenner to lead him across. One Brethner - an Ely fenner, named Budde or Pudding on account of his large size - elected to lead the king. Cnut replied if the ice could hold Brethner's weight it would surely hold his. Thus the king and his retinue followed over the "bending and cracking ice" to Ely. Brethner, a serf, was set free by the king with some free lands for his good deed.

But by 1813 the lake was no more: an agricultural study describes the area:

St Felix

St Felix of Burgundy,  'Apostle of the East Angles', founded Soham Abbey in Soham around 630 AD but it was destroyed by the Danes in 870 AD.  Luttingus, an Anglo-Saxon nobleman, built a cathedral and palace at Soham around 900 AD, on the site of the present-day Church of St Andrew and adjacent land.

St Andrew's Church dates from the 12th century. Traces of the Saxon cathedral are said to still exist within the church. In 1102 Hubert de Burgh, Chief Justice of England, granted 'Ranulph' certain lands in trust for the Church of St Andrew. Ranulph is recorded as the first Vicar of Soham and had a hand in designing the 'new' Norman church. The current church is mainly later, the tower being the latest addition in the 15th century. This tower was built to replace a fallen crossing tower and now contains ten bells. The back six were cast in 1788, with two new trebles and two bells being recast in 1808. There are some pictures and a description of the church at the Cambridgeshire Churches website.

Olaudah Equiano or Gustavus Vassa 'The African'

The first black British author and anti-slave activist, Olaudah Equiano, also known as Gustavus Vassa, married a local girl, Susannah Cullen, at St Andrew's Church, on 7 April 1792 and the couple lived in the town for several years.

They had two daughters. Anna Maria was born on 16 October 1793 and baptised in St Andrew's on 30 January 1794. Their second child, Joanna Vassa, was born on 11 April 1795 and was baptised in the parish church on 29 April 1795.

William Case Morris

William Case Morris (1864–1932) was born in Soham on 16 February 1864. He and his father left the town in search of a new life in 1872 after the death of his mother in 1868, finally settling in Argentina in 1874. Morris was horrified by the poverty of the street children, which led him to found several children's homes in Buenos Aires. Morris returned to Soham shortly before his death on 15 September 1932, and was buried in the Fordham Road cemetery. He is commemorated with a statue in Palermo, Buenos Aires as well as railway stations, football stadia and a town, William C. Morris, Buenos Aires, named after him. His legacy lives on with the Biblioteca Popular William C. Morris and 'Hogar el Alba' children's homes located in Buenos Aires which help impoverished children.

Soham rail disaster

The town narrowly escaped destruction on 2 June 1944, during the Second World War, when a fire developed on the leading wagon of a heavy ammunition train travelling slowly through the town. The town was saved by the bravery of four railway staff, Benjamin Gimbert (driver), James Nightall (fireman), Frank Bridges (signalman) and Herbert Clarke (guard), who uncoupled the rest of the train and drove the engine and lead wagon clear of the town, where it exploded, killing Jim Nightall and Frank Bridges but causing no further deaths. Ben Gimbert survived and spent seven weeks in hospital. Although small in comparison to what would have happened if the entire train had blown up, the explosion caused substantial property damage. Gimbert and Nightall were both awarded the George Cross (Nightall posthumously). 
A permanent memorial was unveiled on 2 June 2007 by Prince Richard, Duke of Gloucester followed by a service in St Andrew's Church. The memorial is constructed of Portland stone with a bronze inlay depicting interpretive artwork of the damaged train and text detailing the incident.

Soham murders

In August 2002, Soham became the centre of national media attention following the disappearance and murder of two 10-year-old girls, Holly Wells and Jessica Chapman, who both lived in Soham. They disappeared from the family home of Holly Wells in Redhouse Gardens on the evening of 4 August.

In December 2003, Ian Huntley, who had been employed as the caretaker at the local secondary school, Soham Village College, was convicted of their murders and sentenced to life in prison. He had given a number of police and television interviews while the girls were missing, claiming to have seen them on the evening of their disappearance, and was finally arrested several hours before their bodies were found, following the recovery of clothing belonging to the girls on the school site.

The caretaker's house in College Close where Huntley lived and, as admitted at his trial, where the girls died, was demolished in 2004.

Schools in Soham
 Soham Village College
 St Andrew's Primary School
 The Weatheralls Primary School
 The Shade Primary School

Transport
The A142 road from Ely to Newmarket runs past Soham, and formerly ran through the town. Soham is served by an hourly bus service Monday to Friday (the number '12', on a route linking Cambridge, Newmarket and Ely) and a reduced service on Saturday.

Soham railway station closed to passengers in 1965, and reopened in December 2021. The line through Soham remained open for passenger and goods services between the Midlands and Ipswich/ Harwich/ Felixstowe. After local campaigns for its reopening, it was announced in June 2020 that a new station would be built on the old site. Initial works on the station started in autumn 2020, followed by the main construction during 2021. The first timetabled passenger train to stop at Soham Station for 56 years was the 6.49am towards Ely and Peterborough on Monday 13 December 2021.

Sport and leisure
The Ross Peers Sports Centre is run by the Soham & District Sports Association Committee and is home to the Soham Indoor Bowls Club and Rink Hockey Team

Soham has a non-league football club, Soham Town Rangers F.C., who play at Julius Martin Lane.

See also 
 List of places in Cambridgeshire

Gallery

References

External links

 Soham On-Line
 Soham Town Council
 Soham Staploe Medical Centre
 Staploe Education Trust
 Soham Village College
 The Shade Primary School
 The Weatheralls Primary School
 St. Andrew's Primary School
 St. Andrew's Church, Soham
 Viva Arts & Community Group
 Soham Museum
 Soham Community Archive Network
 Soham Heritage and Tourism
 Soham Train Station (SOJ)
 Soham Post Office
 Soham Library
 Soham Town Rangers Football Club
 The Ross Peers Sports Centre
 Soham Carnival & Heavy Horse Show
 Soham Pumpkin Fair

 
Towns in Cambridgeshire
Civil parishes in Cambridgeshire
East Cambridgeshire District